The Association of Polish Architects is a Polish professional architecture organisation. Since 1948 it has been a member of the International Union of Architects (UIA) and the International Federation of Landscape Architects (IFLA). It also acts as a publishing institution of architectural journals, books and magazines. Since 1995, it has held status of a copyright collective. 

The organisation's headquarters are located at the Konstanty Zamoyski Palace in Warsaw, but it also has 25 local branches across Poland, amongst them in Katowice, Krakow, Wroclaw, Poznan and Opole.

History 
The Association of Polish Architects was established in 1934, but traces its history to earlier institutions, such as the Krakow Technological Association (1877) and the Polish Architects' Delegation (1908). It is a merger of the Polish Architects Association, established in Warsaw in 1926, and the Union of Polish Architects' Associations, established in Poznan in 1929.

Main activities 

 investing, and establishing the ultimate conditions for the development of architectural creativity and its protection,
 supervising the quality of Poland's built (architecture, urban planning, landscape architecture) and natural environment,
 organising cultural, scientific and educational exhibitions, as well as architectural competitions.

Recent Presidents

Awards 
The SARP Honorary Award and the SARP Award of the Year are the two most significant and prestigious Poland's annual architectural prizes. The former is awarded in the recognition of the outstanding lifetime achievements in the field of architecture, and the latter to the designers of most significant contemporary buildings

Publishing 
The Association of Polish Architects is a publisher of architectural journals and magazines, such as the ARCH Magazine, Biuletyn and the Komunikat SARP. In 2018 it published On Adam's House in Paradise (pol. O rajskim domu Adama), a book by the RIBA Royal Gold Medal winner, architect and historian Professor Joseph Rykwert.

Further reading

SARP: http://www.sarp.org.pl/

External links
Stowarzyszenie Architektów Polskich website

References

Architecture-related professional associations
Copyright collection societies
Organisations based in Warsaw
1934 establishments in Poland
Organizations established in 1934